Doce de ovos is a sweet egg cream from Portuguese cuisine made with egg yolks and simple syrup. It is used as a filling for layered sponge cakes, and can be used as a sweet topping for ice creams and other desserts like  Natas do Céu. The cream must be prepared at low temperature or in a bain marie to prevent the egg yolks coagulating.

It is a common component of products offered in Portuguese doçariaconfectionery stores.

See also
Fios de ovos
Ovos moles

References

Portuguese confectionery
Egg dishes
Food ingredients